Skithouse (styled skitHOUSE) was an Australian sketch comedy television series that ran on Network Ten from 9 February 2003 to 28 July 2004. The series was produced by Roving Enterprises. It featured many well-known Australian comedians, including comedy-band Tripod. Reruns can now be seen on The Comedy Channel on Foxtel. In the UK, it is shown on the channel Paramount Comedy 2 and Trouble. The title name itself is a pun on the colloquialism "shithouse".

The series only ran for two seasons, before being cancelled due to a combination of dwindling ratings and the withdrawal of the cable network Foxtel as co-financier of the program's production.

Cast 
Skithouse was produced by Roving Enterprises, a production company formed by Rove McManus. Two key performers were Rove's Rove Live co-hosts  Peter Helliar and Corinne Grant. The show also featured Cal Wilson, Scott Brennan, Fiona Harris, Damian Callinan, Roz Hammond, Michael Chamberlin, Ingrid Bloom, Tom Gleeson, Jason Geary and Ben Anderson. Members of the comedic band Tripod also featured, not just as the band but in the actual skits as well. Tripod are Scod (Scott Edgar), Yon (Simon Hall) and Gatesy (Steven Gates).

The director was Full Frontal alumna, Daina Reid.

Since the cancellation of the series, a number of the stars have moved on to other areas in the comedy industry. Scott Brennan and Fiona Harris starred in Comedy Inc. (before the show's end) as well as Damian Callinan and Cal Wilson staying on Network Ten on The Wedge with Roz Hammond and Ben Anderson as part of the ensemble cast on Thank God You're Here. Tom Gleeson has gone on to host popular ABCTV quiz show, "Hard Quiz" which he has been the host of since October 2016.

The show 
The show consisted of numerous comedic skits. The half-hour shows themselves often seemed to have themes (or at least they repeated the use of sets, costumes, characters and props). Its comedic styling was reminiscent of many classic Australian sketch comedies, like Full Frontal and Fast Forward, sharing common elements such as self-depreciating humour, low-cost props and effects.

Notable characters and sketches 
Many characters recurred throughout the series, often appearing several times in a single episode, creating a semi-coherent storyline. Some more notable recurring characters and/or scenarios are listed below.

The Australian Fast Bowler (Gleeson) a cricket fast bowler, loosely resembling Dennis Lillee, who uses his bowling skills to help people or defend against evil, superhero style - indeed, he has his own sidekick and nemesis (Callinan as The English Batsman). For instance, a choking man would be helped with a ball bowled at his back. The Australian Fast Bowler has  been shown as a 12-year-old boy, the Schoolyard Fast Bowler; one episode also featured the Australian Lawn Bowler, seemingly the Australian Fast Bowler many years later (a reference to the common perception of lawn bowling as an "old people's sport"). Another episode also featured the Australian Spin Bowler and another featured the Australian One Day Fast Bowler (who was quite hopeless to say the least).

Bubble Wrap Man (Yon) Bubble Wrap Man is a send up of traditional superheroes. His outfit consisted of a standard red superhero outfit, complete with underwear on the outside, and a bubble wrap cape. Bubble Wrap Man would appear in stressful situations for other unnamed characters, and say to them, "Pop the bubbles on my cape!." This draws on the theory that popping the bubbles on standard bubble wrap will relieve stress. Once the situation is resolved Bubble Wrap Man then leaves the scene, leaving his calling card, a small piece of bubble wrap.

The "I'll Snap Ya" Guy (Callinan) A parody of an Australian 'bogan' who continually narrates sketches in which he speaks of various people he has punched (or 'snapped'). One episode saw "I'll Snap Ya" Guy being assaulted by Russell Crowe, a reference to the actor's numerous altercations.

Redheads (Gleeson, Wilson, Hammond, Yon) stereotyped white red-haired people who have an extreme fear of sunlight. They seem incapable of natural speech, communicating in squeaks. 

Batman (Callinan) a depressed, alcoholic version of Batman. His Batmobile is a wreck, he has no work, and seems romantically attracted to Robin (Chamberlin). He is perpetually at odds with the more dynamic Captain Terrific (Helliar), who is now Robin's partner.

The "I Love Beer" Guy (Helliar) A man who, despite professing to everyone how much he loves beer, quite obviously cannot stomach the drink. Onlookers try to convince him that it is okay not to drink beer, but he refuses to acknowledge his dislike. This is a mockery of the common stereotype of the beer-drinking Australian male.

The Ticket Lady (Harris) A perpetually cheerful parking inspector who is oblivious to how much she is hated by the general public; she often speaks highly of people while being pelted with rocks, eggs, and other heavy objects. Usually ends a sketch after having something thrown at her, by exclaiming "I love this job!"

Glenn Bush (Brennan) An awkward, annoying schoolboy in his teens, with many pimples and a squeaky voice. Glenn is mostly portrayed at school camp in video diary format, or doing a school biology assignment with his "friend" (Chamberlin), who cannot get rid of him.

Tripod as themselves The three friends engaged in various strange or geeky activities, including playing Dungeons and Dragons, and teaching Yon how to dance. 

"Nothing Suss!" (Gleeson, Brennan) Two men attempt to sell odd products (normally partner exercise equipment) in the medium of an infomercial for their mail order service. The two frequently use the exercise equipment to demonstrate and end up in sexually suggestive positions, while maintaining all the while that there is "nothing suss" about what they are doing.

The credits of each show are accompanied by a song by Tripod. While sometimes new material is used, it is sometimes a song previously featured in their "Song In An Hour" challenge with Triple J.

Although not a regular sketch, one of the best-known segments on "Skithouse" was a sketch depicting an interview with a group of insurgents during the Iraq War. During the sketch, the leader of the militant group realises that his comments are being subtitled in real time and takes offence at the criticism of his English language skills.

Music and theme 
The main title was composed by John Von Ahlen and recorded at Subterrane Recording Studio, and the end credits read "Theme by John Von Ahlen for Planet J Productions". The incidental stings were also recorded at Subterrane Recording Studio. The credits of each show are accompanied by a song by Tripod. A compilation of expanded studio versions of these songs was later released as the album Middleborough Rd, which won an ARIA award in 2005 for Best Comedy Release.

Awards and nominations

ARIA Music Awards
The ARIA Music Awards are a set of annual ceremonies presented by Australian Recording Industry Association (ARIA), which recognise excellence, innovation, and achievement across all genres of the music of Australia. They commenced in 1987.

! 
|-
| 2005 || Classic Skithouse || ARIA Award for Best Comedy Release ||  || 
|-

See also 
 Rove Live
 Tripod

References

External links 
SkitHOUSE at the National Film and Sound Archive
 

Network 10 original programming
Australian television sketch shows
2003 Australian television series debuts
2004 Australian television series endings
Television shows set in Melbourne
Australian comedy television series